Park Sang-Cheol (born February 3, 1984) is a South Korean football player. He previous played for Seongnam Ilhwa Chunma, Chunnam Dragons and Sangju Sangmu Phoenix.

He was arrested on the charge connected with the match fixing allegations on 7 July 2011.

References

 

Living people
1984 births
South Korean footballers
Seongnam FC players
Jeonnam Dragons players
Gimcheon Sangmu FC players
K League 1 players
Association football goalkeepers